YONGNUO(永诺) is the international trademark of photographic equipment manufacturer Shenzhen Yongnuo Photographic Equipment Co.,Ltd. of Shenzhen, China. Which develops and manufactures photographic equipment, including smart camera, lenses, LED video light, flash speedlite, flash trigger, microphone, softbox, and other accessories. YONGNUO makes autofocus prime lenses for Canon、Nikon DSLR cameras, and Canon, Sony, Nikon Mirrorless camera, also make lenses for Olympus and Panasonic.

Mirrorless camera
As of November 2018, YONGNUO was developing an Android smartphone based mirrorless interchangeable-lens camera, with 4G connectivity. The YN450 was released just in China in 2019 using the Canon EF lens mount. In 2020 Yongnuo developed a YN450M version using the standard Micro Four Thirds system lens mount, matching the sensor.

In 2021, YONGNUO launched the YN455 version, with a 20-megapixel Four Thirds sensor, prominent handgrip and tilt screen.

2022, YONGNUO released an upgraded version of YN455, improve the video follow focus speed, shorten the minimum focusing distance.

Prime Lenses
Yongnuo lens now cover 6 main mounts: Canon EF, Canon RF, Sony E-mount,  Nikon F,  Nikon Z, M4/3.

For Canon EF 
 YN14mm F2.8
 YN35mm F1.4
 YN35mm F1.4C DF UWM
 YN35mm F2
 YN40mm F2.8
 YN50mm F1.4
 YN50mm F1.8
 YN50mm F1.8 II
 YN60mm F2 MF
 YN85mm F1.8
 YN100mm F2

For Canon RF 
 YN35mm F2R DF DSM
 YN85mm F1.8R DF DSM

For Sony E 
 YN16mm F1.8S DA DSM (APS-C)
 YN35mm F2S DF DSM
 YN50mm F1.8S DA DSM  (APS-C)
 YN50mm F1.8S DF DSM
 YN85mm F1.8S DF DSM
 85F1.8S DF DSM

For Nikon F 
 YN14mm F2.8N

 YN35mm F2N
 YN40mm F2.8N

 YN50mm 1.4N E
 YN50mm F1.8N
 YN60mm F2NE MF
 YN85mm F1.8N
 YN100mm F2N

For Nikon Z 
 YN35mm F2Z DF DSM
 YN50mm F1.8Z DF DSM
 YN85mm F1.8Z DF DSM

For M4/3 
 YN25mm F1.7M
 YN42.5mm F1.7M II

LED Video Light
YONGNUO has devoted to provide all kinds of professional Lights for photographer、studio and company, which includes Panel Lights、Ring Lights、Studio Lights and Ice Lights.

Studio Light 

 YNLUX100
 LUX160
 YNFLEX180
 YNRAY360
 YNRAY180

Ice Light 

 YN100SOFT
 YN60SOFT
 YN30SOFT
 YN660LED
 YN360 III PRO
 YN360 III
 YN360 Mini
 YN360 II
 YN360S
 YN360

Vlog Light 

 YN216
 YN300 IV
 YN300Air II
 YN300Air
 YN300 III
 YN60
 YN135
 YN365RGB

Interview Light 

 P360 Pro Max
 YN600 Air
 YN9000
 YN6000
 YN1200
 YN900 II
 YN900
 YN600L II
 YN600L

Selfie Light 

 YN708
 YN128

Flash Speedlite
YONGNUO manufacture a range of flash equipment including versions for macro usage and with optical and radio remote control capable of master and slave usage. LED lights for video usage are also manufactured.

Flash for Canon : YN650EX-RF, YN565EX III, YN968EX-RT, YN686EX-RT, YN685 II, YN680EX-RT, YN600EX-RT II, YN568EX III, YN560 IV, YN560 III

Flash for Nikon : YN565EX III, YN568EX III, YN968N II, YN560 IV, YN560 III

Flash for Sony : YN685EX-RF, YN320EX, YN560 IV, YN560 III

Flash for Pentax : YN585EX, YN560 IV, YN560 III

Portable Flash : YN200

Macro Ringlight Flash : YN24EX, YN14EX II, YN14EX

Flash Trigger
The flash triggers produced by Yongnuo are famous for being compatible with Canon, Nikon, Sony, etc. RF603 recognized by photographers, RF603 II has become the benchmark for flash triggers.

 RF603 II For Canon/Nikon
 YN560-TX II For Canon/Nikon/Sony
 YN560-TX PRO For Canon/Nikon/Sony
 YN622 II For Canon/Nikon
 YN32-TX  For Sony
 YN-E3-RT II For Canon

References

External links

hkyongnuo.com Official site
YONGNUO Store Official store
 Yongnuo PhotographyYoutube

 Yongnuo Photography Instagram

Photography companies of China
Lens manufacturers
Manufacturing companies based in Shenzhen
Chinese brands